Jordan Shanks-Markovina (born 18 August 1989), known online as friendlyjordies, is an Australian political commentator, journalist, stand-up comedian and YouTuber. His content often discusses contemporary Australian cultural and political issues, involving self-described "lowbrow humour" style. Shanks' YouTube channel, created in February 2013, has over a million subscribers . He has interviewed politicians including Jodi McKay, Tanya Plibersek, Kristina Keneally, Bill Shorten, Helen Dalton, and former prime minister Kevin Rudd.

Shanks has been involved in numerous legal disputes and controversies. Most notably, Shanks was sued for defamation by former New South Wales deputy premier John Barilaro after Shanks made numerous YouTube videos about Barilaro.

Personal life 
Shanks was born on 18 August 1989. He graduated from Newtown High School of the Performing Arts, and later studied international studies at the University of New South Wales. Prior to becoming a YouTuber, Shanks was a model, appearing in magazines and advertisements throughout Australia and Southeast Asia.

Police launched investigations into two attempts to burn down Shanks' house in Bondi Beach, one attempt on 17 November 2022 which mistakenly targeted his next door neighbor, and another on 23 November 2022, which successfully burned down his home.

YouTube career 

Shanks' channel is primarily focused on comedy videos and political commentary, often in support of the Labor Party and critical of the Liberal and National parties. Early in his YouTube career, Shanks made paid videos for the Australian Council of Trade Unions, GetUp!, and Greenpeace, after approaching them and offering to promote their cause. In 2016, he campaigned against the Sydney lockout laws. Shanks has interviewed and filmed videos with former Prime Minister Kevin Rudd. In July 2021, Shanks released an hour-long self-produced documentary entitled 'Blood water: the war for Australia's water', discussing floodplain harvesting in rural New South Wales and addressing allegations of corruption and mismanagement from local governments in the Riverina. He exclusively interviewed Twitter commentator PRGuy who revealed himself to be Jeremy Maluta, circumventing an attempt by right-wing figure Avi Yemini to identify the owner of the account through legal action.

2019–20 bushfires 
In 2019 and 2020, Shanks released multiple videos alleging that the then New South Wales premier Gladys Berejiklian was one of the main people responsible for increasing the risk of bushfires and the destruction of the koala population in Australia. He created the Twitter hashtag #koalakiller, in reference to Berejiklian. On 10 June 2020, Shanks released an interview with New South Wales Opposition Leader Jodi McKay, discussing topics including the state and federal governments' response to the 2019–20 Australian bushfire season, including widespread deaths of animals. Shanks raised $300,000 for bushfire relief from his stand-up shows and sales of #koalakiller t-shirts.

Clive Palmer 
In 2019, Shanks published a video covering businessman Clive Palmer who was running in the 2019 Australian federal election. There were existing allegations of financial irregularity in the liquidation of Palmer's company Queensland Nickel and alleged failure to pay the company's workers, which Shanks covered, alongside satirising Palmer's behaviour and appearance. In response, Palmer threatened a defamation lawsuit, demanding  and that Shanks cease making public statements about him. Shanks said he would not "capitulate" and released merchandise containing the statements in question. Commentators noted that Palmer appeared to have created a Streisand effect. Other commentators said that Palmer's legal threat was substantially similar to a SLAPP suit and that such threats had a 'chilling effect' on public interest reporting.

Joe Hildebrand 
In 2020, The Daily Telegraph journalist Joe Hildebrand made a complaint to New South Wales police accusing Shanks of stalking and harassment. The police laid no charges.

John Barilaro 

In a political commentary video uploaded 29 June 2020, Shanks included an impersonation of John Barilaro, Deputy Premier of New South Wales, which Barilaro described as "very offensive" and "full of racist undertones". Shanks subsequently filmed a video inside an Airbnb rental property owned by Barilaro, accusing him of corruption and environmental vandalism. In May 2021 Shanks published a letter sent by Barilaro in December of a threat to sue for defamation. In response, Shanks turned up dressed as the video game character Luigi at a National Party event where Barilaro was giving a speech. Barilaro lodged defamation proceedings against Shanks on 27 May 2021. On 8 July Shanks' legal team responded by filing a truth defence, supported by an honest opinion defence for a subset of claims.

In June 2021, friendlyjordies producer Kristo Langker was arrested by officers from the Fixated Persons Unit (FPU), a specialised counterterrorism police unit who often targets lone wolf terrorists, established in response to the 2014 Lindt Cafe siege. Langker was charged with two counts of stalking and intimidating Barilaro after Langker had approached Barilaro at a National Party event with Shanks and on another occasion, where Langker had approached Barilaro while Langker was heading to Macquarie University. Langker's lawyer Mark Davis contested the police's accounts, and he denounced the timing of the arrest being soon after the defamation lawsuit commenced and criticised the use of the FPU. In August 2021 it was revealed that Barilaro had been in contact with the FPU regarding Shanks for at least six months prior to Langker's arrest. This contradicted what Barilaro had earlier told Sky News Australia host Tom Connell, saying that he had not requested the FPU become involved in the matter. In October 2021 John Barilaro resigned as Deputy Premier of New South Wales and as the member for Monaro, citing his defamation case against Shanks as a "big reason" for the decision.

In November 2021, Barilaro settled the defamation case with Shanks, and Shanks issued the following apology: "Mr Shanks accepts that some of the videos he posted were offensive to Mr Barilaro. Mr Shanks understands that Mr Barilaro has been hurt, and apologises to him for that hurt." Shanks was required to pay $100,000 in legal costs and Barilaro received no damages from the settlement. Shanks agreed to edit some of the contested videos, which would remain online, and to stop selling merchandise featuring Barilaro after Barilaro's retirement from politics. 

As of 10 March 2022, the NSW Police dropped all charges against Langker who is considering taking civil action against the police. Conduct of the NSW Fixated Persons Unit has been brought into question with Attorney General Mark Speakman being questioned over the case in budget estimates. Speakman refused to further comment, conceding that the matter may appear before Law Enforcement Conduct Commission.

On 6 June 2022, the Federal Court judge awarded Barilaro $715,000 in defamation damages from Google for the YouTube videos, and referred Shanks and Google for possible prosecution for contempt of court.

ClubsNSW 
In 2020, Troy Stolz was a compliance officer employed by gambling lobby group Clubs NSW. Stolz contacted journalists and federal MP Andrew Wilkie, alleging that clubs in NSW were engaged in widespread non-compliance with anti-money laundering laws. Following this, ClubsNSW terminated Stolz' employment. Stolz sued for unfair dismissal and ClubsNSW counter-sued for unlawful use of confidential information. Stolz has been described as a whistleblower, and suffers from terminal bone cancer.

In 2021, Shanks uploaded multiple videos to the friendlyjordies channel where he criticised ClubsNSW, including a video interview with Troy Stolz titled "The legal way to take a life", in which Stolz detailed his battle with cancer and the impact of his federal court dispute with his former employer ClubsNSW.

ClubsNSW began a highly unusual private prosecution against both Shanks and Stolz, alleging that the video interview constituted contempt of court on both their parts, making Shanks and Stolz face criminal conviction and potential prison sentences. In July 2022 ClubsNSW sought and obtained an interim suppression order, something normally only seen in high-level criminal cases. Following this, the video interview was taken down. The interim order was to last until the application for a more permanent suppression could be heard in full and decided upon and was dropped in September.

In October 2022, the NSW Crime Commission released a report stating that criminals were in fact laundering billions of dollars using poker machines in NSW clubs and pubs.

In February 2023, ClubsNSW discontinued all legal action against Shanks and Stolz. The withdrawal of the court cases is in part associated with the change in the ClubsNSW management, with the sacking of chief executive, Josh Landis.

Acting career 
In May 2022, Shanks made a cameo appearance as a news reporter in an episode of Housos. He also voiced several minor characters in the animated television series Koala Man in January 2023.

References

External links 
 Official website
 

1989 births
21st-century Australian comedians
21st-century Australian male writers
21st-century Australian non-fiction writers
Australian humorists
Australian male comedians
Australian male journalists
Australian male models
Australian people of Croatian descent
Australian people of Scottish descent
Australian political commentators
Australian social commentators
Australian stand-up comedians
Australian YouTubers
Free speech activists
Living people
People educated at Newtown High School of the Performing Arts
People from New South Wales
University of New South Wales alumni
Writers about activism and social change